James Mahon may refer to:
James Patrick Mahon (1800–1891), Irish nationalist journalist, barrister, parliamentarian and international mercenary
Patrick Swift (1927–1983), Irish painter who sometimes wrote under the pseudonym James Mahon
James P Mahon (born 1990), Irish TV journalist, radio broadcaster and blogger
James Mahon (priest) (1773–1837), Anglican priest in Ireland